Shuhari (Kanji: 守破離 Hiragana: しゅはり) is a Japanese martial art concept which describes the stages of learning to mastery. It is sometimes applied to other disciplines, such as Go.

Etymology

Shuhari roughly translates to "to keep, to fall, to break away" or "follow the rules, break the rules, transcend the rules".

Shuhari can be decomposed in 3 kanjis:
 "protect", "obey"—traditional wisdom—learning fundamentals, techniques, heuristics, proverbs.
 "detach", "digress"—breaking with tradition—detachment from the illusions of self, to break with tradition - to find exceptions to traditional wisdom, to find new approaches. In some styles of Japanese music (gagaku and noh), it is also the middle of the song.

 "leave", "separate"—transcendence—there are no techniques or proverbs, all moves are natural, becoming one with spirit alone without clinging to forms; transcending the physical - there is no traditional technique or wisdom, all movements are allowed.

Definition
Aikido master Endō Seishirō shihan stated: "It is known that, when we learn or train in something, we pass through the stages of shu, ha, and ri. These stages are explained as follows. In shu, we repeat the forms and discipline ourselves so that our bodies absorb the forms that our forebears created. We remain faithful to these forms with no deviation. Next, in the stage of ha, once we have disciplined ourselves to acquire the forms and movements, we make innovations. In this process the forms may be broken and discarded. Finally, in ri, we completely depart from the forms, open the door to creative technique, and arrive in a place where we act in accordance with what our heart/mind desires, unhindered while not overstepping laws."

History

The Shuhari  concept was first presented by Fuhaku Kawakami as Jo-ha-kyū in The Way of Tea, "Sado 茶道". Fuhaku based his process from the works of,  Zeami Motokiyo, the master of Noh, which then became a part of the philosophy of Aikido.

Shuhari can be considered as concentric circles, with Shu within Ha, and both Shu and Ha within Ri. The fundamental techniques and knowledge do not change.

During the Shu phase the student should loyally follow the instruction of a single teacher; the student is not yet ready to explore and compare different paths.

See also
Dreyfus model of skill acquisition

References

Japanese martial arts terminology
Educational psychology
Stage theories